Nordborg, is a town with a population of 5,709 (1 January 2022), which was the seat of the former Nordborg municipality (Danish, kommune) in Sønderborg Municipality, Region of Southern Denmark on the northwest half of the island of Als off the east coast of the Jutland peninsula in south Denmark. 

Within the town is Nordborg Castle, a historic castle whose premises are currently used as a boarding school.

The town has been greatly influenced by the presence of Danfoss, a global producer of components for refrigeration and airconditioning, heating and motion control applications, headquartered in the town and founded in 1933.

Nordborg Municipality
The former Nordborg Municipality covered an area of 125 km2, and had a total population of 13,956 (2005). Its last mayor was Jan Prokopek Jensen, a member of the Social Democrats (Socialdemokraterne) political party.

 Egen Parish
 Havnbjerg Parish
 Nordborg Parish
 Oksbøl Parish
 Svenstrup Parish

Over the years the presence of Danfoss has made the former Nordborg Municipality, the site of one of the largest industrial workplaces in Denmark.

In later years, the municipality saw the rise of another major industrial company, Linak, a global producer of electric linear actuator systems. Albeit much smaller than Danfoss (Linak global employment of approx. 1600 people compared to Danfoss 23,000 ), Linak is still a large local employer.

On January 1, 2007 Nordborg Municipality ceased to exist as the result of Kommunalreformen ("The Municipality Reform" of 2007).  It was merged with Augustenborg, Broager, Gråsten, Sundeved, Sydals, and Sønderborg municipalities to form the new Sønderborg Municipality.  This created a municipality with an area of 499 km2 and a total population of 49,886 (2005).

Notable people 

 Joachim Otto Voigt (1798 in Nordborg – 1843 in London) a Danish and German botanist and surgeon specializing in seed plants and pteridophytes
 Theodor Brorsen (1819 in Nordborg – 1895) a Danish astronomer, discovered five comets
 Hans Hartvig Møller (1873 in Nordborg – 1953) rector of Gammel Hellerup Gymnasium (1909-1943), founder of the first Scout patrol for boys in Denmark
 Arnold Burmeister (1899 in Nordborg – 1988) a decorated German general during World War II
 Bo Storm (born 1987 in Nordborg) a retired Danish footballer, currently the assistant manager of FC Roskilde
 Mads Clausen (1905 in Elsmark, parish of Havnbjerg – 1966) a Danish industrialist and founder of Danfoss

References

 Municipal statistics: NetBorger Kommunefakta, delivered from KMD aka Kommunedata (Municipal Data)]
 Municipal mergers and neighbors: Eniro new municipalities map

External links
 The new Sønderborg municipality's official website (Danish only)

Former municipalities of Denmark
Cities and towns in the Region of Southern Denmark
Company towns
Sønderborg Municipality